
The Cathedral of the Sacred Heart or Sacred Heart Church is a historic church located at 414 West 11th Street in Pueblo, Colorado. It is the mother church of the Diocese of Pueblo.

Its building, built in 1912-13, was listed on the National Register of Historic Places in 1989.  It was deemed "an outstanding example of Gothic Revival architecture, includes an inspiring spire, pointed arch windows, and soaring interior vaulting".

History
In October 1860, Fr. Projectus Machebeuf, and Fr. J.B. Raverdy began the 300-mile journey from Santa Fe, New Mexico, north into Colorado Territory. Months later they arrived at the Arkansas River, at the present site of the city of Pueblo. Initially, the priests celebrated mass in the homes of local Catholics, then they began to hold public services in the old Courthouse on 3rd and Santa Fe Avenue, until finally a proper church was established on 13th and West Streets. In 1873 it was the first parish in Pueblo, and it was called St. Ignatius.

A fire destroyed St. Ignatius and its rectory in 1882. Under the direction of the Jesuit priests assigned to serve it, money was raised and second church was built. This time St. Ignatius was situated near the heart of the city, on Grand between 10th and 11th Streets.

Eventually, it served as the parish hall when the present church was built under the pastorate of Msgr. Thomas Wolohan. In 1910, Msgr. Wolohan began planning for a new church to be dedicated to the Sacred Heart of Jesus. On May 5, 1912, the church cornerstone was laid, and within a year, Sacred Heart was dedicated by the Most Reverend Nicholas Matz, Archbishop of Denver.

The construction costs of the church were $48,000 and was realized with the help of the congregation of 190 families. Msgr. Wolohan served as pastor of Sacred Heart for thirty-six years. He is buried in a crypt in the cathedral.

On November 15, 1941, Sacred Heart was elevated to the status of a Cathedral with the establishment of the new Diocese of Pueblo. Since the establishment of Sacred Heart as a Cathedral, it has been served by eight rectors and administrators. In the past few years, the parish has grown from 930 families to well over 1,200. It truly has become a model of good liturgy and ministry for other parishes to emulate as the parish church of the Bishop.

In 1997, the Cathedral celebrated its 125th anniversary with a year-long series of events. It adopted as its motto that year, Strong at Heart after 125 years.

In 1989, the Cathedral was added to the National Register of Historic Places by the U.S. Department of the Interior.

In 2008, the steeple of the cathedral was struck by lightning and was engulfed by flames and was damaged. Work has been completed to replace the steeple and install a lightning rod.  Work was done by HW Houston Construction and Vision Mechanical and the new cross was dedicated. The Bishop of Pueblo was then Stephen Berg.

See also
List of Catholic cathedrals in the United States
List of cathedrals in the United States

References

 Colorado Historical Society
 National Register of Historic Places

External links

 Official Cathedral Site
 Diocese of Pueblo Official Site

Religious organizations established in 1873
Roman Catholic churches completed in 1913
Churches in Pueblo, Colorado
Sacred Heart Pueblo
Churches in the Roman Catholic Diocese of Pueblo
Churches on the National Register of Historic Places in Colorado
National Register of Historic Places in Pueblo, Colorado
Gothic Revival architecture in Colorado
20th-century Roman Catholic church buildings in the United States